Sphenomorphus oligolepis  is a species of skink found in Papua New Guinea.

References

oligolepis
Reptiles described in 1914
Taxa named by George Albert Boulenger
Skinks of New Guinea